Sara Little Turnbull (née Finkelstein; September 21, 1917 – September 3, 2015) was an American product designer, design innovator and educator. She advised corporate America on product design from 1935 – 2005, and has been described as "corporate America's secret weapon." She was one of America's early industrial designers and one of the first women to succeed in a male-dominated post-World War II design industry. She helped to create essential products from medical masks to space suits, and founded and led both the Sara Little Center for Design and the Process of Change: Laboratory for Innovation and Design at the Stanford Graduate School of Business.  She approached design as a self-trained cultural anthropologist and believed that a thorough understanding of the fine-grain details of how different cultures behaved was key to successful and innovative business solutions.

Early life and education 

Sara Finkelstein was born on September 21, 1917, in Manhattan, New York to Russian immigrant parents, and was raised in Brooklyn. Her mother introduced her to the use of color and form by arranging fruits and vegetables in bowls. She was a child actress in the Yiddish Theater, and in high school, she received early accolades in design, winning an award for textile design. She attended Parsons School of Design on scholarships from the School Art League of NYC and the National Council of Jewish Women, graduating in 1939 with a degree in Advertising Design. 

Because she was 4'11" in height, she acquired the nickname "Little Sara," and then began to call herself Sara Little professionally.

Career

House Beautiful 
During college, Sara Little worked at Marshall Field & Company (now Macy’s) as an assistant art director in illustration and package design, then as an art director at Blaker Advertising Agency. On graduation, she was hired as an editorial assistant at House Beautiful magazine, where she wrote the "Girl with a Future" column until she rose to the position of Decorating Editor, which she held for nearly two decades.  

At House Beautiful, she anticipated and helped develop the American post-World War II domestic lifestyle.  By asking, "how can we help these people put their lives back together through ideas in our magazine?" She encouraged readers to use more informal space in the home (in what eventually became known as the family room), share living space with a roommate, and organize small spaces for maximum domestic efficiency (she lived for 20 years in a  hotel room from which she also ran her international consulting practice).

Independent design consultant 
In 1965, Little left the magazine world and formed Sara Little Design Consultant. At the time, she wrote a trade article for Housewares Review entitled "Forgetting the Little Woman". Her premise was that most companies created products for retail buyers, instead of considering the people who were actually going to use them. The story caught the attention of prominent executives, including the heads of General Mills, 3M and Corning Glass. All three companies eventually hired her as a product research and marketing consultant to assist in finding new applications for technologies developed for the war effort. She helped create disposable medical and antipollution masks made from non-woven fibers, which inspired the design details for today’s N-95 masks, as well as soy protein foodstuffs, and the ubiquitous freezer-to-oven CorningWare that was developed from a material originally used on missile cones.   

During her 70-year design career she was more than anything else a strategic design consultant. She was one of the earliest professional designers to promote human-centered design methodology, consumer awareness, and cultural change to an international slate of companies such as: Procter & Gamble, Coca-Cola, General Mills, Macy’s, Neiman Marcus, Marks & Spencer, American Can, DuPont, Ford, Nissan, Pfizer, Revlon, Elizabeth Arden, Lever Brothers, Motorola, NASA and Volvo. She collaborated on a range of domestic products including housewares, home storage systems, foodstuffs, the glass cooktop, microwave cooking products, personal care, medication delivery systems, cosmetics, new fabric manufacturing processes (knit and non-wovens), space suits, furniture, toys, decoration and packaging, household cleaning products, pet care, tapes and adhesives, and car interiors.  

Many of her ideas arose from her intense interest in world cultures and nature. Her work often showcased what later became known as the principles of biomimicry. She traveled frequently to destinations such as Borneo, Malaysia, the Philippines, India, Japan, China, Kenya, and more, always on the lookout for how people and animals solved the problems of everyday living. Her design for a pot lid was inspired by observing cheetahs grasping their prey in the wild. “It always starts with a fundamental curiosity,” she said of her quest for innovative product design. “When I can't find the answer in a book, I go out and search for it. The excitement of my life is that I have always jumped into the unknown to find what I needed to know.” In another case, she began the design process for a burglar-proof lock by interviewing imprisoned persons.

Center for Design Research 
In 1971, she established the Center for Design Research at the Tacoma Art Museum in Washington State to archive and display her collection of over 3500 artifacts gathered during her travels. The study collection includes body coverings and accessories, food preparation and dining implements, textiles, fine and folk art, much of which had influenced her concepts for domestic product design. These artifacts were used for her own inspiration as a part of her design methodology. The collection was deaccessioned from the Tacoma Art Museum in 2003 and has been re-established in Seattle, WA as the Sara Little Turnbull Center for Design Institute, focused on educating the public on design, and design scholarship for women.

Process of Change: Laboratory for Innovation and Design 
In 1988, Little founded and, for the next 18 years, directed the Process of Change: Laboratory for Innovation and Design at the Stanford Graduate School of Business.  The Laboratory tracks change internationally, in more than 375 areas including, education, healthcare, aging, sexuality, food and nutrition, housing, politics, and culture. Little used this information to fuel her design concepts. "The quality of life of a people dictates what they design, what they make," she said. "It's a reflection of life itself."

In her work with students at Stanford, Little continually emphasized digging deep into the "why" of a product before leaping into the "how," in order to avoid designing products that only addressed superficial symptoms rather than the deeper need. Sara stated: “The designer is the conscience of the company. We can't expect anyone else to fill this role. That’s why the Process of Change Laboratory delineated the need to know more. Design requires a background of scholarship, otherwise, it remains a visual trick.”

Teaching, awards and honors 

In addition to her work at Stanford, Sara Little was a guest lecturer at schools such as Parsons School of Design, Rhode Island School of Design, MIT, Harvard, Illinois Institute of Technology, Copenhagen Business School, University of Washington, San Francisco State University and University of California Berkeley.   

She received a Distinguished Designer Fellowship from the National Endowment for the Arts in 1988; the Trailblazer Award from the National Home Fashion League (1980), and an honorary doctorate from Academy of Art University (2003). Also, in 1980 she is mentioned in the United States Congressional Record with distinction by Oregon Senator Mark O. Hatfield.

In 2008, Chrysler Corporation established the Chrysler Sara Little Turnbull Scholarship at Academy of Art University.  The Modern Art Council of the San Francisco Museum of Modern Art designated her a "Bay Area Living Treasure" in 2001. In 2006, at the age of 89, Sara Little received the Lifetime Achievement Award from ico-D (International Congress of Graphic Design Associations), becoming the only person from the United States to do so.

Board service 

 1948: Design Associate, American Institute of Decorators
 1951-54: Alumni Board, Parsons School of Art and Design
 1960s: Board, Home Furnishings Council (HFC)
 1960-1980s: Board of Trustees, School Art League of the City of New York
 1965-70: Board of Trustees, Parsons School of Art and Design
 1972: Board Member, The Architects Collaborative (TAC)
 1979: Board of Directors and Founding Board Member, Innovative Design Fund, Inc
 1980s: Board of Directors, Tacoma Art Museum
 1990s: Board of Directors, Corporate Design Foundation (CDF)
 1991: Board of Directors, Long Term Care Implementation Committee at the Age Center Alliance, Inc.
 1995: Advisory Member, National Design Forum
 1998: Board of Directors, Tacoma Art Museum
 2004: Board of Directors, Cooper Hewitt Museum and Committee for the Arts

Personal life and death 
At age 48, she married James R. Turnbull, then executive vice president of Douglas Fir Plywood Association in Tacoma, Washington. Later, when James Turnbull became executive vice president of National Forest Products Association, they moved to Washington, D.C., with an apartment at the Watergate complex. They were living there during the White House plumbers break-in. The couple had no children.

Sara Little Turnbull died in 2015 at age 97 in Seattle.

Footnotes

External links 
Sara Little Turnbull official website
Sara Little Turnbull Foundation

Product designers
American industrial designers
1917 births
2015 deaths
Design educators
Industrial design
Parsons School of Design alumni